Aroor is a census town at the northern end of Alappuzha district and the southern suburb of the city of Kochi in the state of Kerala, India. It is a seafood related industrial area of Alleppey district, and acts as the Southern entry point into Kochi city.

Aroor is at present a gramapanchayath located just south of Kochi Urban Agglomeration. It is expected to be a part of Kochi UA in the upcoming census, since its urban growth is now continuous with Kochi city.

Location
Aroor is the northernmost tip of Alappuzha district and lies on the National Highway 66 at the south end of Kochi Bypass. It is around 14km south of Ernakulam, the city centre of Kochi, which is the largest city in Kerala widely known as its commercial hub. 

Aroor is linked to the nearby land Kumbalam island in Kochi, through a bridge. The Aroor-Kumbalam Bridge is the second-longest bridge (now the bridge is doubled with four-lane traffic) in Kerala, spanning about 993 m. It links Aroor with Kochi city at Kumbalam through the Kochi Bypass. The bypass opened to traffic in 1987.

St. Augustine's Church is a major attraction, on the highway in the heart of Aroor. The parish is also the part of Mundamveli Parish and separated in the early 1900s. The saint, originally from Africa, has been given an almost Aroorian identity, with countless stories of how he takes a walk around Aroor at night with his staff, visiting every neighbourhood, to keep the place safe. The current church, over 138 years old, was built on land donated by the Aelavanthara family.

Demographics
 Indian census, Aroor had a population of 39,214. Males constitute 49% of the population and females 51%. Its average literacy rate is of 84% higher than the national average of 59.5%. 11% of the population is under 6 years of age.

"

History
The name "Aroor" traces its origins to the phrase "Arayarude Oor", which means the place of Hindu fishermen, mainly the sub class Vaalarayar or Vaala, deriving their name from their unique fishing equipment, "Dragon Tailed" (Vaal in Malayalam) net used in their legal fishery. It was later shortened as "Arayaroor" and subsequently to the present version.

Aroor provides the former Travancore and Cochin states with a history. In the pre-independence days, the coastal tip was known for its adventurous youngsters who would try to get goods past the vigilant customs (one state to another). Much later, in independent India, Aroor was famous for having elected K. R. Gowri Amma, the indomitable lady politician of Kerala, for a record of eight times, to the Kerala Legislative Assembly position.

Temples 
Aroor Puthuvaranad Temple is a famous temple in Aroor. The idol of Kali is similar to the Kali idol of Dakshineswaram Kolkatha. The temple belongs to the Chirammel Kambakkaran Family, the landlords in Aroor. Hundreds of acres of land were surrendered during the time of land reforms.

Aroor Karthyayani Temple is another main temple in Aroor. The name "Aroor" is derived from this temple. It is on the National Highway. Arookutty road starts from the Aroor junction. Aroor Cheruvally Temple and the Kavu with the temple, known as Paradevatha Kavu and Kizhakkedathu Kavu are scenic attractions in the temple. The banyan tree at the southwestern corner of the temple, and the Ganapathi idol known as the Aaltharra Ganapathi, are other attractions of the temple. The Ganapathi idol is similar to the idol of Pillayarpatti Ganapathi. Pillayara patti is a place near Karaikudi, Tamil Nadu. Kottilakkattu Kudumpa Paradevatha is also near the Cheruvally Temple. The long Pala Maram of the Devasthanam is a main attraction. Aroor Vattakkeril Temple is the secular temple of Aroor. The Garuda Vahana Ezhunnalleth and Thadi Thullal are the main attractions in the festival.

Politics
Aroor assembly constituency is part of Alappuzha (Lok Sabha constituency).

Prominent hospitals
 State Government Hospital
 ESI Dispensary
 Lakshmi Hospital
 Mercy Hospital
 Karthika Hospital
 Jeevans Hospital, Chandiroor
 Chandiroor Mission Hospital

Industries
Seafood export is a major industry of the area, given that Aroor is near Vembanad lake, a part of Kerala backwaters. This ecosystem helps large-scale prawn and shrimp farming to be an alternative to the low-lying paddy fields, which have the interlocked water system connected to the Kerala backwaters. Secondly the Cochin fishing harbour and port is just 15 km away from Aroor. The abundance of marine wealth and logistical advantages have helped the seafood export to grow, especially around Aroor. There are many marine food processing units in Aroor which provide employment to a number of people. The raw seafood catch is also purchased by large seafood export firms from North Kerala, Kollam, South Karnataka, Orissa, and Tamil Nadu, processed and preserved in cold storages, and then trans-shipped through Cochin port.

Another large business is Keltron Controls, which is the control and instrumentation division of Keltron

References

Cities and towns in Alappuzha district
Suburbs of Kochi